was the third head of the Kakuda-Ishikawa clan.

Life
Munekata was born on June 26, 1607, in Igu, Mutsu Province, as the son of Ishikawa Yoshimune. His childhood name was Kumamasumaru. In 1610, his father, Yoshimune, died of an illness, but because Yūzōmaru was still young, his grandfather, Akimitsu, became his guardian. In 1616, he received a letter from Date Masamune for his genpuku, and he was renamed Muneaki. In 1619, he married Masamune's daughter, Muuhime. In 1621, he officially succeeded as the third head of the Kakuda-Ishikawa clan. He received 2,000 koku, totaling in 12,000 koku. On November 20, 1668, at the age of 62, Munekata died from an illness.

References 

1608 births
1683 deaths
People of Edo-period Japan